Boniface Ontuga Mweresa (born 13 November 1993 in Nyamira) is a Kenyan sprinter specialising in the 400 metres. He competed in the 4 × 400 m relay at the 2012 Summer Olympics. His personal bests in the event are 44.96 seconds outdoors (Birmingham 2022) and 46.33 seconds indoors (Portland 2016).  He is a Commonwealth bronze medalist in the 4x400m relay at the 2022 Commonwealth games.

Competition record

1Disqualified in the final

References

Kenyan male sprinters
1993 births
Living people
Olympic athletes of Kenya
Athletes (track and field) at the 2012 Summer Olympics
Athletes (track and field) at the 2015 African Games
African Games gold medalists for Kenya
African Games medalists in athletics (track and field)
Athletes (track and field) at the 2018 Commonwealth Games
World Athletics Championships athletes for Kenya
People from Nyamira County
African Games silver medalists for Kenya
Commonwealth Games competitors for Kenya
21st-century Kenyan people
Commonwealth Games bronze medallists for Kenya
Commonwealth Games medallists in athletics
Athletes (track and field) at the 2022 Commonwealth Games
Medallists at the 2022 Commonwealth Games